Mencas is a commune in the Pas-de-Calais department in the Hauts-de-France region of France.

Geography
Mencas is situated in the valley of the Lys river, 20 miles (32 km) northeast of Montreuil-sur-Mer, on the D133 road.

Population

Places of interest
 The church of the Visitation.

See also
Communes of the Pas-de-Calais department

References

Communes of Pas-de-Calais